The 1955 Humboldt State Lumberjacks football team represented Humboldt State College during the 1955 college football season. Humboldt State competed in the Far Western Conference (FWC).

The 1955 Lumberjacks were led by fifth-year head coach Phil Sarboe. They played home games at the Redwood Bowl in Arcata, California. Humboldt State finished with a record of seven wins, three losses and one tie (7–3–1, 2–2–1 FWC). The Lumberjacks outscored their opponents 254–171 for the season.

Schedule

Notes

References

Humboldt State
Humboldt State Lumberjacks football seasons
Humboldt State Lumberjacks football